Shalimar Bagh is a Mughal garden in Srinagar, Jammu and Kashmir, India, linked through a channel to the northeast of Dal Lake. It is also known as Shalimar Gardens, Farah Baksh, and Faiz Baksh. The other famous shoreline garden in the vicinity is Nishat Bagh, 'The Garden of Delight'. The Bagh was built by Mughal Emperor Jahangir, for his wife Nur Jahan, in 1619. The Bagh is considered the high point of Mughal horticulture. It is now a public park and also referred to as the "Crown of Srinagar".

History

Shalimar Bagh was built by Mughal Emperor Jahangir for his wife Nur Jahan, in 1619.

He had this garden made to please his queen. He enlarged the ancient garden in 1619 into a royal garden and called it 'Farah Baksh' ('the delightful'). In 1630, under Emperor Shah Jahan’s orders, Zafar Khan the governor of Kashmir extended it. He named it ‘Faiz Baksh’ ('the bountiful'). It then became a pleasure place for the Sikh governors of the province.

During the rule of Maharaja Ranjit Singh, the marble pavilion was the guest house for European visitors. Electrification of the premises was done during Maharaja Hari Singh’s rule. Thus, over the years, the garden was extended and improved by many rulers and called by different names, but the most popular name ‘Shalimar Bagh’ continues to this day.

During the Mughal period, in particular, Emperor Jahangir and his wife Nur Jahan were so enamoured of Kashmir that during summer they moved to Srinagar with their full-court entourage from Delhi at least 13 times. Shalimar Bagh was their imperial summer residence and the Royal Court. They crossed the arduous snowy passes of the Pir Panjal mountain range on elephants to reach Srinagar.

Layout

The layout of the garden is an adaptation of another Islamic garden layout known as the Persian gardens. The garden was built on flat land on a square plan with four radiating arms from a central location as the water source. It needed to be modified to suit the hilly terrain and availability of a well, which could be diverted from a higher elevation to the planned gardens. Modifications involved the main channel running through the garden axially from top to the lowest point. This central channel, known as the Shah Nahar, is the main axis of the garden. It runs through three terraces. This layout left out the radial arms and the shape became rectangular, instead of a square plan of the Chahar Bagh.

The garden has three terraces fitted with fountains and with chinar (sycamore) tree-lined vistas. The Shahnahar is the main feeder channel to all the terraces. Each one of the three terraces has a specific role.

Willow groves and rice terraces fringed the lake edge. Broad green paths bordered the lake with rows of chinar trees. The garden was laid in trellised walkways lined by avenues of aspen trees planted at  interval.

Architecture

The architectural details of the three terraces of the garden are elaborate.

The first terrace is a public garden or the outer garden ending in the Diwan-e-Aam (public audience hall). In this hall, a small black marble throne was installed over the waterfall.

The second terrace garden along the axial canal, slightly broader, has two shallow terraces. The Diwan-e-Khas (the Hall of Private Audience), which was accessible only to the noblemen or guests of the court, now derelict, is in its centre. However, the carved stone bases and a fine platform surrounded by fountains are still seen. The royal bathrooms are located on the north-west boundary of this enclosure. The fountain pools of the Diwan-e-Khas, the Diwan-e-Aam, and in turn, the Zenana terrace are supplied in succession. It has 410 fountains.

In the third terrace, the axial water channel flows through the Zenana garden, which is flanked by the Diwan-e-Khas and chinar trees. At the entrance to this terrace, there are two small pavilions or guard rooms (built in Kashmir style on stone plinth) that is the restricted and controlled entry zone of the royal harem. Shah Jahan built a baradari of black marble, called the Black Pavilion in the zenana garden. It is encircled by a fountain pool that receives its supply from a higher terrace. A double cascade falls against a low wall carved with small niches (chini khanas), behind the pavilion. Two smaller, secondary water canals lead from the Black Pavilion to a small baradari. Above the third level, two octagonal pavilions define the end wall of the garden. The baradari has a lovely backdrop of the snow mountains, which is considered a befitting setting for the Bagh.

The Shalimar Bagh is well known for chini khanas, or arched niches, behind garden waterfalls. They are a unique feature in the Bagh. These niches were lighted at night with oil lamps, which gave a fairy tale appearance to the waterfalls. However, now the niches hold pots of flower pots that reflect their colours behind the cascading water.

Another unusual architectural feature mentioned is about the doors of the Baradari. In the garden complex, the Baradari had four exquisite doors made of stones supported by pillars. It is conjectured that these stone doors were ruins from old temples that were demolished by Shahjahan. The garden also provided large water troughs where a variety of fountains were fixed.

It has been aptly described by a chronicler glowingly:

Even in later years, during Maharaja's rule, the gardens were well maintained and continue to be so even now as it is one of the prominent visitor attractions around the Dal Lake.

The garden is considered to be very beautiful during the autumn and spring seasons due to the colour change in leaves of the famed Chinar trees.

The gardens were the inspiration for other gardens of the same name, notably the Shalimar Bagh, Delhi in Delhi (built in 1653, which now also has an upscale colony) and Shalimar Gardens in Lahore, Pakistan built by Emperor Shah Jahan in 1641.

The black pavilion built during the early part of Jahangir's reign (1569–1627), in the top terrace of the Shalimar Bagh, has the famous inscription in Persian, which says:
اگر فردوس بر روے زمین است
همین است و همین است و همین است
Agar Firdaus bar rōy-e zamin ast,hamin ast-o hamin ast-o hamin ast''.
This is a couplet wrongly attributed to the Persian-language poet Amir Khusrau, But written by a Persian poet 'Orfi Shirazi during his visit to Kashmir, which is inscribed on many buildings in the Indian subcontinent.

Translated to English, it means:

It is also mentioned that when Jahangir was asked on his death bed about his cherished desire he is credited to have said:

See also

 Achabal Gardens
 Nishat Bagh
 Verinag
 Gardens in India
 Indo-Islamic Architecture

References

External links

 The Herbert Offen Research Collection of the Phillips Library at the Peabody Essex Museum

Gardens in Jammu and Kashmir
Mughal gardens in India
Mughal terraced gardens
Tourist attractions in Srinagar
Persian gardens in India
1619 establishments in the Mughal Empire
Neighbourhoods in Srinagar
Cities and towns in Srinagar district